Paratomoxia scutellata is a species of beetle in the genus Paratomoxia of the family Mordellidae. It was described by Kônô in 1928.

References

External links
Coleoptera. BugGuide.

Beetles described in 1928
Mordellidae